BioScience is a monthly peer-reviewed scientific journal that is published by Oxford University Press on behalf of the American Institute of Biological Sciences. It was established in 1964 and was preceded by the AIBS Bulletin (1951–1963).

The journal publishes literature reviews of current research in biology, as well as essays and discussion sections on education, public policy, history of biology, and theoretical issues.

Abstracting and indexing 
The journal is abstracted and indexed in MEDLINE/PubMed (1973–1979), the Science Citation Index, Current Contents/Agriculture, Biology & Environmental Sciences, The Zoological Record, and BIOSIS Previews. According to the Journal Citation Reports, the journal has a 2020 impact factor of 8.589.

References

External links 
 
 Journal page at the American Institute of Biological Sciences

Biology journals
Publications established in 1964
Oxford University Press academic journals
Monthly journals
English-language journals
Academic journals associated with learned and professional societies of the United States